Gervin Panduka Samarawickrama is a Sri Lankan physician and academic. He was the inaugural Vice-Chancellor of University of Ruhuna.

Biography
Samarawickrama was born 5 July 1938 in Colombo, the son of Stephen Samarawickrama and Darlina née Wijeratne.

Samarawickrama graduated from the University of Ceylon in 1967 with a Bachelor of Medicine, Bachelor of Surgery. Following which he was the medical officer-in-charge Venereal Diseases Clinic in Galle between 1968 and 1969, employed at the Government Hospital, Hurikaduwa between 1969 and 1971, and a lecturer, then senior lecturer at the University of Peradeniya between 1971 and 1980. In 1975 he obtained a Doctor of Philosophy from the University of London. In 1980 he was employed as the head of the department of community medicine at Ruhuna University College. In 1984 following the elevation of the Ruhuna University College to full university status he was appointed the University's inaugural Vice-Chancellor.

References

1938 births
Sinhalese physicians
Sri Lankan academic administrators
Alumni of the University of Ceylon
Alumni of the University of London
Living people
Alumni of Mahinda College
Vice-Chancellors of the University of Ruhuna
Sri Lankan academics
Academics from Galle
People from Galle